Julie Colleen Rubio (born August 9, 1969) is an American film director, producer, screenwriter, and actor based in the San Francisco Bay Area. As the founder of East Meets West Productions, Rubio is best known for producing the award-winning independent film East Side Sushi.

Early life 
The youngest of seven siblings and half-siblings, Rubio was born in Burbank, CA, and grew up in the Los Angeles area. After studying at Los Angeles Pierce College, she was trained in acting, producing and directing at the Lee Strasberg Theater and Film Institute in both London and New York City. She lived intermittently in California, Hawaii, London and New York. During this period, Rubio acted in commercials and plays (including productions at the Old Ohio Theater), and modeled for magazines.

Career

Film

2000s–2010s: Early work 
In 2003, Rubio directed, produced, and starred in an exercise video, Yoga Can Balance Your Life. That same year, she wrote and directed her first short film, "Impression", based on a feature-length screenplay written earlier by Rubio. "Impression" was followed by other short films (“Concerned Lady for America”, “Del Cielo”, and “Soledad is Gone Forever”) in which her involvement ranged from acting to writing, directing, and producing. In 2006, she directed, produced, and wrote her first feature-length film, Six Sex Scenes and a Murder, a murder-mystery noir. After Six Sex Scenes and a Murder, Rubio worked on several short films, including "Oakland B Mine". In 2011, Rubio served as executive producer, director, and writer, as well as portraying “Elijah’s Mom” for her debut feature, Too Perfect, a bittersweet coming-of-age tale following several middle-schoolers as they confront big changes in their lives. On her involvement in Too Perfect, Doniphan Blair of CineSource Magazine described Rubio as a “sharp stylist and outspoken activist, politically and cinematically”.

2014: East Side Sushi 
Rubio produced her best-known film, the award-winning East Side Sushi, in 2014. A story about a Mexican immigrant in Oakland, California who dreams of becoming a sushi chef, East Side Sushi touched on many issues that were personally important to Rubio. She said of the production process, “We were able to mix cultures together and have them be respectful of each other…East Side Sushi is such a feminist piece, a very beautiful story about going after your dreams and not giving up. It’s about empowering women. I love that, through this film, we can help little girls grow up with positive role models. I truly believe we can change the world through film.”  East Side Sushi was Rubio’s first major critical success, with wins at fourteen film festivals and two more nominations. The film was named one of "the 20 best Bay Area movies of the decade" by the Mercury News.

2017–present: Further projects 
Since East Side Sushi, Rubio has produced, written and directed several other short films. She has helped to manage her son Elijah “Kahleo” Stavena’s growing rap career, including producing some of his music videos. Rubio continues to explore themes of cultural sensitivity, gender inequality, and human connection in her upcoming project, a feature-length film called One. One will focus on a Napa Valley wine field worker who follows in her mother’s footsteps to attend Harvard University, where she discovers disturbing revelations about her biological father and works to uncover a solution to sexual assault and gender inequality on campus. The film’s focus on big-picture issues is something that Rubio is committed to maintaining in her filmmaking: "Movies can change people, and I want to be part of that change in a positive way." One is currently in pre-production. In 2020, Rubio became the Director of Business for Women in Film SF Bay Area. Rubio is currently in pre-production for her upcoming documentary feature, Tamara, which explores the life of Polish Art Deco artist Tamara de Lempicka.

Fashion 
Rubio owned and operated J. Colleen Boutique in Lafayette, California from August 2013 to August 2016.

Personal life 
Rubio gave birth to her only child in 1996, Elijah “Kahleo” Stavena. Rubio moved to Orinda, CA in the early 2000s, where she continued the career in independent film which she had begun in New York. Rubio married Blake Wellen in 2009.

Filmography

References

External links 
 

American film directors
1969 births
Living people
American film producers